Russian Time (previously known as RT Russian Time) was a Russian motor racing team founded by Igor Mazepa to compete in the GP2 Series, a category of open-wheel racing cars designed to prepare drivers for Formula One.

From 2015 to 2018, the team was managed by Virtuosi Racing.

Racing history

GP2 Series
Russian Time was established by former Russian racing driver and manager Igor Mazepa and Motopark Academy team principal Timo Rumpfkeil in 2013. The team had sought an entry to the GP2 Series for two years before finally being accepted in 2013, replacing iSport International. iSport International withdrew from the series after being unable to secure a budget to compete in the upcoming season, and so its management elected to shut the team down in order to avoid bankruptcy.

The team won its first race in only its fourth appearance, when Sam Bird won the sprint race of the Bahrain round of the championship. The team took a second win on the streets of Monaco, with Bird finishing ahead of Kevin Ceccon after a fourteen-car pile-up on the opening lap forced nine drivers out of the race. In 2014, the team made their debut in GP3 Series, taking Bamboo Engineering's slot and continue to participate in GP2, German Formula Three and ADAC Formel Masters.

The team's preparations for the 2014 season were disrupted by the death of Mazepa from complications relating to thrombosis in February 2014. Following this, Motopark Academy ended their partnership with team, leaving their participation in the 2014 GP2 and GP3 seasons in limbo. The team reunited with iSport International to continue their GP2 programme, signing Mitch Evans and Artem Markelov, but chose to abandon their plans for their GP3 entry, selling it on to Hilmer Motorsport.

Evans and Markelov were retained for the 2015 season, the first time a GP2 team has entered back to back seasons with the same lineup since DAMS retained Kamui Kobayashi and Jérôme d'Ambrosio in 2009. But the team changed the management from iSport to Virtuosi Racing. The team finished fifth in the team's championship, with two sprint race wins for Evans.

For the 2016 season, Markelov was retained for a third season with Raffaele Marciello joining the team. Markelov achieved his maiden victory at the Monaco feature race, having started fifteenth on the grid. Marciello finished fourth in the standings and Markelov tenth with the team taking third in the constructor's championship.

FIA Formula 2 Championship

In , Markelov remained with the team for a fourth season with Luca Ghiotto joining the team, moving from Trident. Their combination brought six wins—five for Markelov and one for Ghiotto—and the first teams' title in the history of FIA Formula 2 Championship. The team was omitted from the preliminary entry list for the 2018 championship, but later confirmed their participation, retaining Markelov and hiring European Formula 3 driver Tadasuke Makino to replace Ghiotto. The team was not able to repeat their success with the new F2 car, finishing the season fourth in the teams' standings, while Markelov downgraded to fifth in the drivers' championship with three wins. Makino won a feature race at Monza, but finished outside the top-ten in the drivers' standings. The team were sold before the 2018 finale and became UNI-Virtuosi Racing.

Results

GP2 Series

FIA Formula 2 Championship

In detail

GP2 Series 
(key) (Races in bold indicate pole position) (Races in italics indicate fastest lap)

FIA Formula 2 Championship

References

External links

  

GP2 Series teams
Russian auto racing teams
FIA Formula 2 Championship teams
Auto racing teams established in 2013
2013 establishments in Russia
2018 disestablishments in Russia
Auto racing teams disestablished in 2018